Winter X Games XXIII (re-titled Winter X Games Aspen '19; styled as Winter X Games Twenty-Three in the official logo) were held from January 24 to January 27, 2019, in Aspen, Colorado. They are the 18th consecutive Winter X Games held in Aspen. The events were broadcast on ESPN. 

Participating athletes compete in six skiing events, eight snowboarding events, one snowmobiling event and five snow bike events.

Results

Medal count

Skiing

Women's SuperPipe results
Source:

Men's SuperPipe results
Source:

Women's SlopeStyle results
Source:

Men's SlopeStyle results
Source:

Women's Big Air results
Source:

Men's Big Air results
Source:

Snowboarding

Special Olympics Unified Snowboarding Dual Slalom results

Women's SuperPipe results
Source:

Men's SuperPipe results
Source:

Women's SlopeStyle results
Source:

Men's SlopeStyle results
Source:

Women's Big Air results
Source:

Men's Big Air results
Source:

Men's Knuckle Huck results
Source:

Snowmobiling / BikeCross

Snowmobile Freestyle results
Source:

BikeCross results
Source:

Adaptive BikeCross results
Source:

Snow Bike Best Trick
Source:

Snow Bike Hill Climb

Para BikeCross
Source:

Ref

References

External links
 
X Games Aspen official website
 Results

XXIII
2019 in winter sports
2019 in American sports
Multi-sport events in the United States
Skateboarding competitions
Skiing competitions in the United States
ESPN
Snowmobile racing
Annual sporting events in the United States
January 2019 sports events in the United States